Dawson may refer to:

People and fictional characters
Dawson (surname), including a list of people and fictional characters with the name
Dawson (given name), including a list of people and fictional characters with the name

Places

Antarctica 
Dawson Head, Palmer Land
Dawson Nunatak, Mac. Robertson Land
Dawson Peak, Ross Dependency

Australia 
Division of Dawson, an electoral district in the Australian House of Representatives, in Queensland
Dawson River (New South Wales)
Dawson River (Queensland), a river in eastern Queensland, Australia
Dawson, South Australia, a locality and former town northeast of Peterborough

Canada 
Dawson City, Yukon
Dawson (electoral district), Yukon Territory
Dawson Range (Yukon), in the Yukon Ranges
Dawson Creek, a city in northeastern British Columbia, Canada
Dawson Range (British Columbia)
Dawson Falls, British Columbia
Dawson, Ontario
Dawson Township, Ontario (disambiguation)
Dawson Trail (electoral district), Manitoba

Chile 
Dawson Island, an island in the Strait of Magellan south of the city of Punta Arenas in Chile

Ireland 
Dawson Street, Dublin

Singapore 
Dawson, Singapore, a public housing estate in Queenstown, Singapore

United States 
Dawson, Alabama, a small community
Dawson, Georgia, a city
Dawson, Illinois, a village
Dawson, Iowa, a city
Dawson Springs, Kentucky, formerly known as "Dawson City"
Dawson, Maryland, an unincorporated community
Dawson, Missouri, an unincorporated community
Dawson, Minnesota, a city
Dawson, Nebraska, a village
Dawson, New Mexico, a ghost town
Dawson, North Dakota
Dawson, Ohio, an unincorporated community
Dawson, Oregon, an unincorporated community
Dawson, Pennsylvania, a borough
Dawson Historic District, a national historic district located at Dawson, Fayette County, Pennsylvania
Dawson, Texas, a town
Dawson County, Georgia
Dawson Forest, a public-use forest located in Dawson County, Georgia
Dawson County, Montana
Dawson County, Nebraska
Dawson County, Texas
Dawson, Austin, Texas, a neighborhood
Camp Dawson (New Jersey), a small recreational area
Dawson, West Virginia
Camp Dawson (West Virginia), an Army National Guard facility
Dawson Peak, a mountain in Angeles National Forest, California
Dawson Township (disambiguation), two townships in the United States

Moon 
Dawson (crater), a lunar impact crater on the far side of the Moon

Transportation

Australia 
Dawson Highway, Queensland
Dawson railway station, a closed station in Victoria

Canada 
Dawson Bridge, Edmonton, Alberta
Old Dawson Trail, 19th century route between Thunder Bay, Ontario and Winnipeg, Manitoba

United States 
Dawson Community Airport, Dawson County, Montana, USA
USS Dawson (APA-79), a US Navy World War II attack transport

Education
Dawson College, Quebec, Canada
Dawson Community College, Glendive, Montana
Dawson School, an historic school building located in Tulsa, Oklahoma

Buildings
Dawson Brothers Plant, a historic factory building
Dawson Building, a historic building at 1851 Purchase Street in New Bedford, Massachusetts
Dawson Tower, located on Kadugannawa in the Kadugannawa Pass

Sport
Dawson City Nuggets, a hockey team from Dawson City, Yukon Territory, Canada
Dawson Creek Kodiaks, a Canadian Junior ice hockey team from Dawson Creek, British Columbia, Canada
Dawson Creek Rage, an ice hockey team based out of Dawson Creek, British Columbia

Other uses
Dawson baronets, two baronetcies in the Baronetage of the United Kingdom
Dawson Car Company, created in 1918 by AJ Dawson, previously works manager at Hillman
Dawson function, a mathematical function
Dawson v. Delaware, a United States Supreme Court decision about a person's rights of association and due process

See also
Dawson Farm, a historic property located at Rockville, Montgomery County, Maryland
Dawson murder case, parents and five children were murdered in Baltimore, Maryland, in 2002
Dawson massacre or expedition, an 1842 clash between Mexico and the Republic of Texas
Dawson's (disambiguation)